Dorell Lawrence Wright (born December 2, 1985) is an American former professional basketball player. Wright was drafted in the 2004 NBA draft by the Miami Heat directly out of high school. He has also played for the Golden State Warriors, Philadelphia 76ers and Portland Trail Blazers. He has previously led the league in three-pointers made, and was selected to participate in the NBA Three-Point Contest in 2011.

High school career
Wright attended Washington Preparatory High School in ninth and tenth grade before transferring to Leuzinger High School. After his senior year at Leuzinger, he enrolled as a fifth-year senior at South Kent School in Connecticut, where he averaged 29.4 points, 14 rebounds and 5 blocks per game in basketball.

Considered a five-star recruit by Rivals.com, Wright was listed as the No. 4 small forward and the No. 12 player in the nation in 2004. He initially committed to attend DePaul before entering the NBA draft.

Professional career

Miami Heat (2004–2010)
Wright was selected 19th overall by the Heat in the 2004 NBA draft. On February 5, 2005, he made his professional debut in a 108–97 win over the Chicago Bulls.

On January 3, 2006, Wright was assigned to the Florida Flame of the NBA Development League. On January 18, he was recalled by the Heat. At the end of the year, he was the youngest member of the Heat's first NBA championship squad.

On August 21, 2008, Wright re-signed with the Heat.

Golden State Warriors (2010–2012)

On July 12, 2010, Wright signed with the Golden State Warriors. On November 27, he set a franchise record with nine three-point field goals made, surpassing Jason Richardson's record of eight three-pointers set on March 29, 2007. On February 8, 2011, he was selected to compete in the 3-Point Shootout at the 2011 NBA All-Star Weekend in Los Angeles.

On March 18, 2011, against the Phoenix Suns, Wright went scoreless in the first half, but scored 30 points in the second half in a 108–97 loss. He finished the game with 30 points, 6 rebounds, 2 assists, and 2 blocks. On March 23, he scored a career-high 34 points to go with 5 rebounds and 6 assists against the Houston Rockets in a 131–112 loss.

On April 6, 2011, Wright set a Warriors franchise record for three-point shots made in a season with 184 in a home win versus the Los Angeles Lakers, beating Jason Richardson's previous record of 183 in the 2005–06 season. On April 13, 2011, he became the first player in NBA history to have scored more points in his seventh season than all of his first six combined in a win against the Portland Trail Blazers. He also ended the season with the most three-point shots made in the 2010–11 season with 194, as well as the most three-point field goals attempted with 516, both of which set Warriors franchise records. The records were surpassed by Stephen Curry in the 2012–13 season, when Curry set the NBA record for three-point field goals made.

After the 2010–11 season, Wright finished third in voting for NBA Most Improved Player, behind LaMarcus Aldridge and Kevin Love.

Philadelphia 76ers (2012–2013)

On July 11, 2012, Wright was traded to the Philadelphia 76ers in a three-team trade. On October 31, 2012, he made his debut for the 76ers in an 84–75 win over to the Denver Nuggets, recording three points, one rebound and one assist in 16 minutes.

Portland Trail Blazers (2013–2015)
On July 10, 2013, Wright signed with the Portland Trail Blazers. On October 30, 2013, he made his debut for the Trail Blazers in a 104–91 loss to the Phoenix Suns, recording three points, one rebound and one assist in 16 minutes.

Beikong Fly Dragons (2015–2016)
On August 17, 2015, Wright signed with the Beikong Fly Dragons of the Chinese Basketball Association. In 37 games for the Dragons, he averaged 24.3 points, 7.5 rebounds, 2.5 assists and 2.0 steals per game.

Return to the Heat (2016)
On April 12, 2016, Wright signed with the Miami Heat, returning to the franchise for a second stint. On April 17, Wright checked in during the final minutes of a 123–91 win over the Charlotte Hornets in Game 1 of the first round of the playoffs. He received a standing ovation from what remained of the home crowd. In his first appearance for the Heat in six years, he scored eight points on 3-of-3 shooting.

On September 26, 2016, Wright signed with the Los Angeles Clippers, but was waived on October 12 after appearing in two preseason games.

Europe (2017–2020)
On October 3, 2017, Wright signed with Igokea for the 2017–18 season. After only four games he left Igokea and on October 27, 2017, he signed with German club Brose Bamberg for the rest of the season. On July 20, 2018, Wright signed a one-year deal with Lokomotiv Kuban of the VTB United League.

Retirement and later ventures 
On November 18, 2020, Wright announced his retirement from professional basketball on his Instagram page, after a 16 year career in the NBA, China, and Europe. As of 2020, Wright has worked as a studio analyst for NBC Sports Bay Area on pre-game and post-game coverage.

Career statistics

NBA

Regular season

|-
| style="text-align:left;|
| style="text-align:left;|Miami
| 3 || 0 || 9.0 || .273 || .000 || 1.000 || .3 || 1.0 || 1.3 || .0 || 2.3
|-
| style="text-align:left;|
| style="text-align:left;|Miami
| 20 || 2 || 6.6 || .465 || .500 || .882 || 1.6 || .4 || .2 || .1 || 2.9
|-
| style="text-align:left;|
| style="text-align:left;|Miami
| 66 || 19 || 19.6 || .445 || .147 || .744 || 4.1 || 1.4 || .6 || .7 || 6.0
|-
| style="text-align:left;|
| style="text-align:left;|Miami
| 44 || 34 || 25.1 || .488 || .364 || .826 || 5.0 || 1.4 || .7 || .9 || 7.9
|-
| style="text-align:left;|
| style="text-align:left;|Miami
| 6 || 0 || 12.2 || .400 ||  || .333 || 3.3 || .3 || .3 || .0 || 3.0
|-
| style="text-align:left;|
| style="text-align:left;|Miami
| 72 || 1 || 20.8 || .463 || .389 || .884 || 3.3 || 1.3 || .7 || .4 || 7.1
|-
| style="text-align:left;|
| style="text-align:left;|Golden State
| 82 || 82 || 38.4 || .423 || .376 || .789 || 5.3 || 3.0 || 1.5 || .8 || 16.4
|-
| style="text-align:left;|
| style="text-align:left;|Golden State
| 61 || 61 || 27.0 || .422 || .360 || .816 || 4.6 || 1.5 || 1.0 || .4 || 10.3
|-
| style="text-align:left;|
| style="text-align:left;|Philadelphia
| 79 || 8 || 22.6 || .396 || .374 || .851 || 3.8 || 1.9 || .8 || .4 || 9.2
|-
| style="text-align:left;|
| style="text-align:left;|Portland
| 68 || 13 || 14.5 || .374 || .342 || .754 || 2.8 || .9 || .3 || .2 || 5.0
|-
| style="text-align:left;|
| style="text-align:left;|Portland
| 48 || 2 || 12.6 || .379 || .380 || .810 || 2.3 || .9 || .4 || .2 || 4.6
|- class="sortbottom"
| style="text-align:center;" colspan="2"|Career
| 549 || 222 || 22.4 || .424 || .365 || .806 || 3.8 || 1.5 || .8 || .5 || 8.4

Playoffs

|-
| style="text-align:left;|2007
| style="text-align:left;|Miami
| 1 || 0 || 1.0 ||  ||  ||  || .0 || .0 || .0 || .0 || .0
|-
| style="text-align:left;|2009
| style="text-align:left;|Miami
| 1 || 0 || 3.0 ||  ||  ||  || .0 || .0 || .0 || .0 || .0
|-
| style="text-align:left;|2010
| style="text-align:left;|Miami
| 5 || 0 || 22.4 || .360 || .250 || 1.000 || 3.8 || 1.8 || .4 || .0 || 5.0
|-
| style="text-align:left;|2014
| style="text-align:left;|Portland
| 8 || 0 || 11.0 || .368 || .333 || .733 || 2.0 || .4 || .4 || 1.1 || 3.6
|-
| style="text-align:left;|2016
| style="text-align:left;|Miami
| 5 || 0 || 3.8 || .500 || .400 || .1000 || 1.2 || .4 || .0 || .0 || 3.2
|- class="sortbottom"
| style="text-align:center;" colspan="2"|Career
| 20 || 0 || 11.2 || .389 || .320 || .833 || 2.1 || .7 || .3 || .5 || 3.5

EuroLeague

|-
| style="text-align:left;|2017–18
| style="text-align:left;|Brose Bamberg
| 27 || 22 || 25.8 || .421 || .422 || .873 || 5.4 || 1.7 || .9 || .4 || 11.6 || 12.8
|- class="sortbottom"
| style="text-align:center;" colspan="2"|Career
| 27 || 22 || 25.8 || .421 || .422 || .873 || 5.4 || 1.7 || .9 || .4 || 11.6 || 12.8

Personal life
In August 2014, Wright married long-time girlfriend, Mia Lee. He is the older brother of Washington Wizards guard Delon Wright.

Wright played Sevyn Streeter's love interest in the music video of Streeter's "It Won't Stop".

See also
 List of NBA season leaders in three-point field goals

References

External links

 Profile at euroleague.net

1985 births
Living people
21st-century African-American sportspeople
African-American basketball players
American expatriate basketball people in Bosnia and Herzegovina
American expatriate basketball people in China
American expatriate basketball people in Germany
American expatriate basketball people in Russia
American men's basketball players
Basketball players from Los Angeles
Beijing Royal Fighters players
Brose Bamberg players
Florida Flame players
Golden State Warriors players
KK Igokea players
Miami Heat draft picks
Miami Heat players
National Basketball Association high school draftees
PBC Lokomotiv-Kuban players
Philadelphia 76ers players
Portland Trail Blazers players
Small forwards
South Kent School alumni
20th-century African-American people